Jenny Miller (born February 5, 1980) is a Filipino actress. She is known on her role as Beverly Castro in the TV remake of the 1989 film Babangon Ako't Dudurugin Kita that aired on GMA Network in 2008 and she is currently a freelance artist.

Career
Miller started her acting career on ABS-CBN in the Philippines. She first appeared in the show Buttercup (2003) and then got a spot in the supporting cast on the series Marina as Vyxia in 2004. Then followed her role as a Fire Fairy on the horror series Spirits (2005). Her last show on ABS-CBN was Kokey, a fantasy kids series.

Miller changed to the rival GMA Network in 2007. Her first role was on Impostora co-starring with Iza Calzado, Sunshine Dizon and Jean Garcia. She became one of the main cast of the drama Babangon Ako't Dudurugin Kita in the role of Beverly, which aired in 2008. In 2009 Miller guest starred on the series All About Eve.

She is an additional cast member on the series Luna Mystica as one of the villains. Presently she is also a regular cast member of the horror drama series Midnight DJ aired on TV5 in the role of Trixie, and she is in the supporting cast on the TV show All My Life on the GMA Network. In 2010, she also appears in the GMA made-for-TV movie Tinik Sa Dibdib.

Personal life
Miller has a brother, actor and Kumu livestreamer Eian Rances, who gained prominence after joining Pinoy Big Brother: Kumunity Season 10 as a celebrity housemate.

Filmography

Television

Movies

Notes

References

External links

1980 births
Living people
Filipino film actresses
Filipino television actresses
People from Lucena, Philippines
Actresses from Quezon
Star Magic
21st-century Filipino actresses